Senator Kennedy may refer to:

Members of the Northern Irish Senate
Norman Kennedy, Northern Irish Senator from 1965 to 1973

Members of the United States Senate
Anthony Kennedy (Maryland politician) (1810–1892), U.S. Senator from Maryland from 1857 to 1863
John F. Kennedy (1917–1963), U.S. Senator from Massachusetts from 1953 to 1960
John Kennedy (Louisiana politician) (born 1951), U.S. Senator from Louisiana since 2017
Robert F. Kennedy (1925–1968), U.S. Senator from New York from 1965 to 1968
Ted Kennedy (1932–2009), U.S. Senator from Massachusetts from 1962 to 2009

United States state senate members
Alfred J. Kennedy (1878–1944), New York State Senate
Ambrose Jerome Kennedy (1893–1950), Maryland State Senate
Andrew Kennedy (American politician) (1810–1847), Indiana State Senate
Brian T. Kennedy (1934–2012), New Jersey State Senate
Craig Kennedy (politician) (born 1951), South Dakota State Senate
Edward M. Kennedy Jr. (born 1961), Connecticut State Senate
Gene Kennedy (politician) (born 1927), Iowa State Senate
George N. Kennedy (1822–1901), New York State Senate
Harry Kennedy (politician) (born 1952), Missouri State Senate
Hiram Raleigh Kennedy (1852–1913), Alabama State Senate
Joe Kennedy (Georgia politician) (1930–1997), Georgia State Senate
Martin J. Kennedy (1892–1955), New York State Senate
P. J. Kennedy (1858–1929), Massachusetts State Senate
Thomas P. Kennedy (1951–2015), Massachusetts State Senate
Thomas Kennedy (1776–1832), Maryland State Senate
Timothy M. Kennedy (politician) (born 1976), New York State Senate
William Kennedy (Connecticut politician) (1854–1918), Connecticut State Senate
William Kennedy (Wisconsin politician) (1841–1910), Wisconsin State Senate

See also
John R. Kennaday (1830–1884), American lawyer and politician from New York